Lizard was a United States privateer schooner commissioned at Salem on 19 February 1814.  captured Lizard on 5 March. Lizard had been out 12 days and had made no captures. Prometheus sent Lizard into Halifax, Nova Scotia, where the Vice admiralty court condemned her.

American sources gave the name of Lizards master as Samuel Loring. The Vice admiralty records show the master as B.Cook.

Citations

References
 
 

1814 ships
Privateer ships of the United States
Captured ships